The 1937 Virginia Cavaliers football team represented the University of Virginia during the 1937 college football season. The Cavaliers were led by first-year head coach Frank Murray and played their home games at Scott Stadium in Charlottesville, Virginia. They competed as independents for the first time after quitting the Southern Conference in 1936, finishing with a record of 2–7.

Schedule

References

Virginia
Virginia Cavaliers football seasons
Virginia Cavaliers football